Dayglo is the second studio album by the American band Love Battery. It was released in 1992 by Sub Pop.

The band supported the album with a North American tour that included shows with L7.

Critical reception

The Chicago Tribune noted that, "unlike some of its upper-left-coast peers, Love Battery takes a more textured, psychedelic approach to modern rock." USA Today determined that the band "adds discernible melody, trance-inducing rhythms, guitar tremolo and trippy effects, plus lyrics shaded by a very distant influence, Georgia-based R.E.M."

The Seattle Times deemed the music "a dense, psychedelic-tinged sound that has more in common with the English 'dream pop' movement of My Bloody Valentine and Ride than the Seattle grunge sound of Mudhoney and Tad." The Columbus Dispatch called the album "the right mix of '60s garage psychedelia and Neil Young-style music-as-primal-scream-therapy."

Track listing 
 "Out of Focus" – 5:23
 "Foot" – 3:48
 "Damaged" – 3:58
 "See Your Mind" – 3:21
 "Side (With You)" – 5:00
 "Cool School (Trane of Thought)" – 4:27
 "Sometimes" – 3:23
 "Blonde" – 4:19
 "Dayglo" – 3:42
 "23 Modern Stories" – 3:29

Personnel 
Ron Nine - Vocals, guitar
Kevin Whitworth - Guitar
Jason Finn - Drums
Jim Tillman - Bass

References

Love Battery albums
1992 albums
Sub Pop albums
Albums produced by Conrad Uno